Dictyocaulus viviparus is a species of nematodes belonging to the family Dictyocaulidae.

The species has cosmopolitan distribution. It is parasitic, and has the common name of the bovine lungworm due to its negative impact on cattle.

References

Strongylida
Nematodes described in 1782
Parasitic nematodes of mammals